Cyperus inops is a species of sedge that is native to southern parts of Brazil.

The species was first formally described by the botanist Charles Baron Clarke in 1908.

See also
 List of Cyperus species

References

inops
Taxa named by Charles Baron Clarke
Plants described in 1908
Flora of Brazil